Sędziejowice  is a village in the administrative district of Gmina Chmielnik, within Kielce County, Świętokrzyskie Voivodeship, in south-central Poland.

The village has a population of 460.

Notable people 
 Aleksander Wielopolski (1803 in Sędziejowice  - 1877 in Dresden) a Polish aristocrat, owner of large estates and the 13th lord of the manor of Pińczów.

References

Villages in Kielce County

鄭錦生